The 1978 Mexico City WCT was a men's tennis tournament played on indoor carpet courts in Mexico City, Mexico. The event was part of the World Championship Tennis series of tournaments that were incorporated into the 1978 Grand Prix circuit. It was the third edition of the tournament and was held from 30 January until 5 February 1978. First-seeded Raúl Ramírez won the singles title, his second at the event after 1976.

Finals

Singles
 Raúl Ramírez defeated  Pat DuPré, 6–4, 6–1
 It was Ramírez' 1st singles title of the year and the 14th of his career.

Doubles
 Sashi Menon /  Gene Mayer defeated  Marcello Lara /  Raúl Ramírez, 6–3, 7–6

References

External links
 ITF tournament edition details

Mexico City
Mex
Mexico City WCT